Eva Ottawa is an Atikamekw political figure. She was the first women to be elected Grand Chief of the Conseil de la Nation Atikamekw and the first Indigenous woman to lead the Conseil du statut de la femme du Québec. She received the Queen Elizabeth II Diamond Jubilee Medal in 2012 and the Médaille Premiers Peuples in 2019. She is currently a law professor at the University of Ottawa.

References 

Indigenous leaders in Canada
First Nations women
Atikamekw people
1971 births
Living people
Academic staff of the University of Ottawa